Viking Valley is a valley lying on the east side of Mars Glacier containing a braided stream which feeds into Secret Lake, situated in the southeast corner of Alexander Island, Antarctica. This area was the prime research site of the 1992-93 Mars Glacier field party led by D. D. Wynn-Williams. The feature was named by the United Kingdom Antarctic Place-Names Committee in 1993 in association with nearby Mars Glacier. The name "Viking" stems from the Viking Lander project of NASA which first searched for life on Mars in 1976.

See also

 Ablation Valley
 Flatiron Valley
 Moutonnée Valley

Valleys of Antarctica
Valleys of Alexander Island